Narciso Oswaldo Orellana Guzmán (born 28 January 1995) is a Salvadoran professional footballer who plays as a midfielder for Primera División club Alianza and the El Salvador national team.

Club career

Titán
In 2010, Orellana signed with Titán.

Isidro Metapán
Orellana signed with Isidro Metapán for the Apertura 2013. He left the club after the Clausura 2017 ended.

Alianza
Orellana signed with Alianza for the Apertura 2017. Orellana scored in a 7–0 victory against Chalatenango in the Estadio Cuscatlán, in the second leg of the quarter-finals of the Apertura 2018, in December 2018.

On 8 December 2018, Orellana was sent off in the second leg of the semi-finals of the Apertura 2018, a 2–2 draw against FAS. Alianza reached its fifth consecutive final since the Apertura 2016.

With Alianza, Orellana won two national league titles: Apertura 2017 and Clausura 2018.

International career

International goals
Scores and results list El Salvador's goal tally first.

References

External links
 

1995 births
Living people
Salvadoran footballers
People from Metapán
Association football midfielders
A.D. Isidro Metapán footballers
Alianza F.C. footballers
Salvadoran Primera División players
El Salvador international footballers
El Salvador under-20 international footballers
El Salvador youth international footballers
2015 CONCACAF U-20 Championship players
2015 CONCACAF Gold Cup players
2017 CONCACAF Gold Cup players
2019 CONCACAF Gold Cup players
2021 CONCACAF Gold Cup players